Colchester Rugby Football Club is an English rugby union club based in Colchester, Essex. The first XV team plays in Regional 1 South East at Level 5 in the English rugby union system, having been promoted (third) from London 1 North following the England RFU national and regional league re-organisation at the end of the 2021-22 season. Col spent two earlier seasons at Level 5 (2015-16 and 2016-17) in National League 3 London & SE.

Club honours

1st team:
London 3 North East champions: 1994–95
Eastern Counties 2 champions: 2001–02
Eastern Counties 1 champions: 2002–03
London 2 (north-east v north-west) promotion playoff winners: 2009–10
London 1 North champions: 2014-15
London 1 North third (promoted): 2021-22

2nd team:
Eastern Counties 2 (South) champions: 2014–15

3rd team:
Eastern Counties 3 (South) champions: 2014–15
Eastern Counties 2 (South) champions: 2015–16

4th team:
Eastern Counties 4 (South) champions: 2014–15

References

English rugby union teams
Rugby union clubs in Essex
Sports clubs in England
Sport in Colchester